Meadow fritillary is a common name given for two butterfly species:

 In Europe, the name is used for Melitaea parthenoides
 In North America, the name is used for Boloria bellona

Animal common name disambiguation pages